Earl Rose may refer to:
 Earl Rose (composer) (born 1946), American composer
 Earl Rose (coroner) (1926–2012), Dallas County medical examiner during the assassination of John F. Kennedy
 Earl Rose (rugby union) (born 1980), South African rugby union player